Kalevi Heinänen (13 March 1927 – 27 June 2008) was a Finnish basketball player. He competed in the men's tournament at the 1952 Summer Olympics.

References

1927 births
2008 deaths
Finnish men's basketball players
Olympic basketball players of Finland
Basketball players at the 1952 Summer Olympics
Sportspeople from Helsinki